Päivi is a Finnish female given name, derived from the word ‘päivä’, meaning ‘day’. Its name day is June 16.

Some notable people with this name:
 Päivi Aaltonen, (born 1952), retired Finnish archer
 Päivi Alafrantti (born 1964), retired Finnish javelin thrower
 Päivi Räsänen (born 1959), Finnish politician
 Päivi Setälä (1943–2014), Finnish historian and professor

Finnish feminine given names